Kordia ulvae is a Gram-negative, aerobic and rod-shaped bacterium from the genus Kordia which has been isolated from the alga Ulva.

References

Flavobacteria
Bacteria described in 2016